The 2000 Canadian Figure Skating Championships were held on January 26–30, 2000 at the Canadian Airlines Saddledome in Calgary, Alberta. They were the figure skating national championship which determines the national champions of Canada. The event was organized by Skate Canada, the nation's figure skating governing body. Skaters competed at the senior, junior, and novice levels in the disciplines of men's singles, ladies' singles, pair skating, and ice dancing. The results of this competition were used to pick the Canadian teams to the 2000 World Championships, the 2000 Four Continents Championships, and the 2000 World Junior Championships.

Senior results

Men

Ladies

Pairs

Ice dancing

Junior results

Men

Ladies

Pairs

Ice dancing

Novice results

Men

Ladies

Pairs

Ice dancing

External links
 2000 Bank of Montreal Canadian Championships

Canadian Figure Skating Championships
Figure skating
Canadian Figure Skating Championships
Sport in Calgary
2000 in Alberta